Kevin Freeman (born March 3, 1978) is a retired American basketball player and currently an assistant coach for the UConn Huskies.  Freeman played professionally for eleven years in several countries and as a collegian was a starter on UConn's first NCAA championship team.

College career
Freeman, a 6' 7" power forward from Paterson Catholic High School in Paterson, New Jersey but also played at Longmeadow High School in Massachusetts, played collegiate basketball at the University of Connecticut for Hall of Fame coach Jim Calhoun.  He started for the majority of his four years there.  As a junior in the 1998–99 NCAA Division I men's basketball season, Freeman averaged a career-high 12.2 points and 7.3 rebounds per game.  He led the Huskies to a Big East Conference tournament championship, and was named the tournament Most Valuable Player.  Connecticut then went on to win the 1999 NCAA basketball tournament, with Freeman gaining All-West Regional honors to get the Huskies to the Final Four.

Following the Huskies' championship year, Freeman was named to the USA men's basketball team at the 1999 World University Games in Palma de Mallorca, Spain.  He played in all eight contests, averaging 8.0 points and 4.4 rebounds per game as Team USA won the Gold Medal.

Freeman returned to Storrs as Husky co-captain for his senior season, averaging 11.0 points and 5.7 rebounds per game.  Kevin Freeman left UConn with 1,476 points and 913 rebounds, and graduated as the school's all-time leader in games played with 140.

Professional career

Following the close of his college career, Freeman began a far-reaching professional career that led him to play in the Philippines, Greece, Italy, Argentina, China, Mexico, Spain, Puerto Rico, South Korea and Venezuela.  Some of his best work came in the National Basketball League of Australia as a member of the Brisbane Bullets.  Freeman was a big scorer in the league, including finishing top five in scoring for the 2003–04 season (22.3 points per game).

Coaching career
After retiring from basketball, Freeman turned to coaching.  He was named to Jim Calhoun's staff just prior to the 2011–12 season as Assistant Director of Basketball Operations. On June 4, 2018, Penn State Head Coach Patrick Chambers announced that Freeman was joining the staff  as an assistant coach. On September 2, 2020 head coach Dan Hurley announced that Kevin Freeman was coming home to be an assistant basketball coach for the UConn Huskies men's basketball program.

References

External links
 https://gopsusports.com/sports/mens-basketball/roster/coaches/kevin-freeman/951

1978 births
Living people
American expatriate basketball people in Argentina
American expatriate basketball people in Australia
American expatriate basketball people in China
American expatriate basketball people in Greece
American expatriate basketball people in Italy
American expatriate basketball people in Mexico
American expatriate basketball people in the Philippines
American expatriate basketball people in South Korea
American expatriate basketball people in Spain
American expatriate basketball people in Venezuela
American men's basketball players
Ángeles de Puebla (basketball) players
Aris B.C. players
Basketball players from Springfield, Massachusetts
Brisbane Bullets players
Cocodrilos de Caracas players
Leones de Ponce basketball players
Medalists at the 1999 Summer Universiade
Paterson Catholic High School alumni
Penn State Nittany Lions basketball coaches
Philippine Basketball Association imports
Power forwards (basketball)
UConn Huskies men's basketball players
United States Basketball League players
Universiade gold medalists for the United States
Universiade medalists in basketball
Zhejiang Golden Bulls players
San Miguel Beermen players
Tanduay Rhum Masters players